Fred Gibson (born 26 October 1981 in Waycross, Georgia, United States) is a former wide receiver and former NBA D-League guard.

College career
Gibson attended University of Georgia and majored in Speech Communications.

As a member of the Bulldogs' football team, Gibson wore jersey #82. During his senior year, he led the team with seven touchdowns and caught 49 passes for 801 yards. During Gibson's tenure with the Bulldogs' football team, they posted a 42–10 record

Gibson also played one season of basketball for the Bulldogs as a walk-on freshman in 2001. In 18 games, Gibson averaged 4.9 points per game.

Gibson was also one of nine other UGA football team players to be declared ineligible for selling his SEC championship ring.

National Football League Career

Pittsburgh Steelers
He was originally drafted by the Pittsburgh Steelers in the fourth round of the 2005 NFL Draft. On May 31, 2005, Gibson signed a three-year, $1.221 million contract with the Steelers, which included a signing bonus of $296,000 and a yearly salary of $230,000 in 2005–06, $310,000 in 2006–07, and $385,000 in 2007–08. Receivers coach Bruce Arians thought Gibson "had great upside", and that "has the height, the speed, and the ability to go long." He was cut by the Steelers on September 3, 2005, and was signed to the Dolphins practice squad Miami Dolphins' practice squad two days later.

Miami Dolphins
Gibson remained with the Dolphins' practice squad during the 2005–06 season. He was waived by the team during final roster cuts prior to the 2006–07 season. On September 3, 2006, once Gibson cleared waivers, he was reassigned to the Dolphins' practice squad.

Atlanta Falcons
After his Dolphins' practice squad contract expired on January 8, 2007, he was signed by the Atlanta Falcons on February 17, 2007.  Gibson was cut three days into training camp after missing a mandatory spring meeting and for other unspecified reasons.

St Louis Rams
Gibson signed with the St. Louis Rams on August 6, 2007, and was released by the team on August 31, 2007.

New York Giants
Shortly after being released from the Rams, Gibson signed a practice squad contract with the New York Giants on September 3, 2007. He was released five days later

NBA D-League
In 2008, Gibson was selected in the tenth round (147th pick overall) of the NBA Development League draft by the Albuquerque Thunderbirds. In 45 games with the Thunderbirds, Gibson averaged 7.3 points per game and 1.2 blocks per game. Gibson left the team in March, and signed with the Austin Toros in April. Gibson played three games with the Toros and was held scoreless.

Gibson was invited back to the Toros for the 2009-10 NBA-D season, but was released before the season started.

References

1981 births
Living people
American football wide receivers
Atlanta Falcons players
Edmonton Elks players
Georgia Bulldogs football players
Miami Dolphins players
People from Waycross, Georgia
St. Louis Rams players